Ben Baur is an American actor known for starring in the LGBT-themed web series Hunting Season. Out named him to its Out100 list in 2015.

Early life
Baur attended West Albany High School in Albany, Oregon, graduating in 2004. Baur graduated from the American Musical and Dramatic Academy.

Career
Baur had guest roles on the television series Nip/Tuck and Happily Divorced before starring as Alex in the LGBT-themed web series Hunting Season. After appearing in the series The Following and Difficult People, he played Kip Stark in several episodes of the web series These People from 2015 to 2016. Baur and longtime friend Thandi Tolmay co-created, co-produced, and co-starred in the web series #Adulting in 2016. He has also written episodes of These People and #Adulting. In January 2017, Baur posted on Instagram that he had worked on the ABC soap opera General Hospital in an undisclosed role. He played mail clerk Noah on the show on February 27, 2017. Baur also wrote and starred in the short film Something New, which premiered at Outfest Los Angeles in 2017.

Filmography

Reception
In 2015, Out named Baur to its Out100 list, after previously placing him on the magazine's "Most Eligible Bachelors" list two years in a row.

Awards and nominations
Baur was nominated for an Indie Series Award for Best Actor (Comedy) in 2012 and 2016 for his work in Hunting Season, and in 2017 for #Adulting. The entire Hunting Season cast won the Indie for Best Ensemble (Comedy) in 2016.

Personal life
Baur is gay. In 2012, he wrote a column for The Huffington Post about his experiences coming out and being an "out gay actor". He and his partner Craig Gates were engaged in May 2018.

References

External links
 

Year of birth missing (living people)
Living people
21st-century American male actors
American male film actors
American male soap opera actors
American male television actors
American gay actors
21st-century American LGBT people